This is a list of Roswell High School (Georgia) state championship appearances.  Roswell High School is located in Roswell, Georgia and has a rich tradition of athletic competition that began when the school opened in 1949.  Roswell's mascot is the hornet and fields athletic teams in 16 sports organized under the Georgia High School Association.  The following lists details seasons in which the Hornets finished as state champions, runners-up, or in some cases within the top four of the state in various sports offered by the school.

References 

Sports in Georgia (U.S. state)
Roswell, Georgia-related lists
Roswell